The Casa de Moneda de Coquimbo was a mint  created in La Serena, established on September 27, 1827, due to the silver mining boom triggered by the discovery of silver at Arqueros (1825). From the point of view of the Chilean government of that period, to purchase silver and make coins in the province of Coquimbo was more economical than transport the silver to Santiago.

This mint is noted for being the only official mint located outside Santiago during the history of Chile.

Gregorio Cordovez del Caso was appointed as intendent of the mint on 24 June, 1828.

Location 

The mint was housed in the cloister of the Iglesia de San Francisco, one of the oldest churches in the city.

History 
Only a few coins were minted in La Serena known individually as "Peso de Coquimbo" (Coquimbo One Peso Coin). According to some authors the mint facility was never operated as planned due to a defective production process, resulting in coins with features that did not match the design specifications. Finally, the "Pesos Coquimbo" were removed from circulation and mostly sent to Santiago to be melted.

On May 18, 1845 the minting machinery was sent to Valparaíso, which at that date was abandoned in the cloister of the Church of San Francisco.

Despite being a short-lived mint, various of its minted coins survived and presently occupy a prominent place in coin collections.

Importance and name 
The Casa de Moneda de Coquimbo was an important part of the history of the northern portion of Chile, when the Norte Chico's mining was the main support for the economy of the nascent republic of Chile. At the same time, the name Coquimbo has remained recorded in the history of the country. Coquimbo is a hispanized word and was the former name for the Elqui River since Pre-Columbian times and gave its name to the territory extending from the Atacama Desert to the Choapa River. Not to be confounded with "Coquimbo", department that was separated from La Serena en 1864.

Coquimbo Peso 

Presently, due to the rarity and scarcity of the coin, the Peso de Coquimbo is considered by the collectors as one of the most valuable coins in the numismatic world.

One of them is preserved in the British Museum in London, and was donated by the Bank of England in 1877. It was transported to Europe by David Ross, the then British Consul for the province of Coquimbo.

Another example of the coin is exhibited in the Museo Numismático del Banco Central de Chile, located in Santiago, and is the most expensive coin in the collection.

References 

1827 in Chile
La Serena, Chile
Government-owned companies of Chile
History of Coquimbo Region